Bothel is a small village in the Allerdale borough of Cumbria, England. Bothel was historically within Cumberland.

Location
It is situated just off the main A595 road, 18 miles (29 km) from Carlisle,  from Keswick and 7 miles (11 km) from Cockermouth.

The village is just outside the boundary of the  Lake District National Park. The A591 road terminates just outside the village, linking Bothel to Bassenthwaite Lake and Keswick.

Governance
The village is in the parliamentary constituency of Workington, Mark Jenkinson, Conservatives, is the Member of parliament.

For Local Government purposes it is in the Aspatria Ward of Allerdale Borough Council and the Bothel and Wharrels Ward of Cumbria County Council.

The village also has its own Parish Council jointly with nearby Threapland; Bothel & Threapland Parish Council.

See also

Listed buildings in Bothel and Threapland
Bothel and Threapland

References

External links
 Bothel information from Aboutbritain.com
 Cumbria County History Trust: Bothel and Threapland (nb: provisional research only – see Talk page)

Villages in Cumbria
Allerdale